Olena Ihorivna Diachenko (born 15 June 2001) is a Ukrainian individual rhythmic gymnast. She is the two-time (2015–16) Ukrainian Junior National champion.

Career

Junior 
Diachenko began appearing in international junior competitions in 2013. In 2015 season, she competed in numerous Junior World Cup events in Lisbon, Budapest, Pesaro, Sofia. Diachenko along with seniors Ganna Rizatdinova and Viktoria Mazur competed at the annual 2015 Aeon Cup where Team Deriugins School won the silver and with Diachenko finishing 7th in junior individual all-around finals.

In 2016 season, Diachenko started her season competing at the 2016 L.A Lights followed by competition at the 2016 Valentine Cup in Tartu, Estonia. She then competed at the Junior World Cup events in Pesaro, Guadalajara, Budapest, Sofia. Diachenko repeated as the Ukrainian Junior National champion. At the 2016 European Junior Championships Diachenko finished 6th with Team Ukraine; she qualified to 3 individual finals finishing 7th in hoop, 6th in clubs and 8th in ball. On September 9–11, Diachenko together with seniors Ganna Rizatdinova and Viktoria Mazur represented team Deriugina school at the annual 2016 Aeon Cup in Tokyo, where they won the team bronze and with Diachenko finishing 4th in the junior individual all-around.

Senior 
Diachenko appeared in her first senior international competition at the Miss Valentine Cup finishing 4th in the all-around. On March 17–19, Diachenko competed at the Kyiv Grand Prix finishing 7th in the all-around. Her next competition was at Thiais Grand Prix where she finished 11th in the all-around. On March 31 - April 2, Diacehnko then competed at the 2017 Grand Prix Marbella finishing 11th in the all-around and qualified to 2 apparatus final. Diachenko appeared in her first World Cup event at the 2017 Pesaro World Cup where she finished 19th in the all-around. She then competed at the 2017 Tashkent World Cup finishing 14th in the all-around and qualified to the ball final. Her next competition was at the 2017 Baku World Cup where she finished 10th in the all-around. On May 19–21, Diachenko along with teammates Viktoria Mazur and Yeva Meleshchuk represented the individual seniors for Ukraine at the 2017 European Championships. On June 23–25, Diachenko competed at the 2017 Grand Prix Holon finishing 7th in the all-around. On July 7–9, Diachenko finished 6th in the all-around behind Sabina Ashirbayeva at the 2017 Berlin World Challenge Cup, she qualified in ball final finishing in 6th and won her first World Cup medal, a bronze in hoop. Diachenko competed at the quadrennial held 2017 World Games in Wrocław, Poland from July 20–30, however she did not advance to any of the apparatus finals. On August 5–7, Duachenko finished 9th in the all-around at the 2017 Minsk World Challenge Cup, she qualified in 2 apparatus finals finishing 4th in hoop and 8th in ball. On August 30 - September 3, at the 2017 World Championships in Pesaro, Italy; Diachenko finished 19th in the all-around finals.

In 2018, On March 15–18, Diachenko started the season competing at the 2018 Kyiv Grand Prix where she finished 10th in the all-around. On March March 24–25; she then finished 15th in the all-around at the 2018 Thiais Grand Prix. On April 7–8, she competed at the RG Tournament Irina Cup in Warsaw, Poland where she finished 4th in the all-around.  On April 27–29, Diachenko then competed in World Cup event at the 2018 Baku World Cup where she won finished 13th in the all-around. On May 16–17, Diachenko competed at the 2018 Holon Grand Prix finishing 13th in the all-around, she qualified in 2 apparatus finals finishing 6th in hoop and 9th in ribbon.

She retired from competition and became a coach in 2020.

Routine music information

References

External links
 
 

Ukrainian rhythmic gymnasts
2001 births
Living people
Gymnasts from Kyiv
Universiade medalists in gymnastics
Universiade silver medalists for Ukraine
Medalists at the 2019 Summer Universiade